Latvia competed at the 2012 Winter Youth Olympics in Innsbruck, Austria. The Latvian team consisted of 16 athletes in 7 sports.

Medalists

Alpine skiing

Latvia qualified one boy and girl in alpine skiing.

Boy

Girl

Biathlon

Latvia qualified a full biathlon team of 2 boys and 1 girl.

Boys

Girl

Mixed

Bobsleigh

Latvia qualified one boy.

Boys

Cross country skiing

Latvia qualified one boy and girl.

Boy

Girl

Sprint

Mixed

Ice hockey

Latvia qualified one boy to compete in the skills challenge competition.

Boy

Luge

Latvia qualified five athletes.

Team

Skeleton

Latvia qualified one boy in skeleton.

Boy

See also
Latvia at the 2012 Summer Olympics

References

2012 in Latvian sport
Nations at the 2012 Winter Youth Olympics
Latvia at the Youth Olympics